The Bluebell Stadium is a football stadium in Lisburn, County Antrim, Northern Ireland. It is the home stadium of local football team Ballymacash Rangers F.C.

Renovation

The new ground was a grass venue from 1984 until July 2020, when a new artificial surface was installed as part of a ground renovation.

Notable matches
The ground played host to the first ever Northern Ireland Football League Women's Premiership game in the city of Lisburn, Northern Ireland. The fixture took place between Lisburn Ladies and Sion Swifts Ladies F.C. on Wednesday 25 April 2022 in front of 106 people.

Use by other teams

The Bluebell Stadium is also used by Lisburn Ladies FC who played in the Northern Ireland Football League Women's Premiership.

References

 Work starts on new £1.5m Ballymacash Sports Academy project
 Â£1.5m sport facility plan revealed
 Ballymacash Rangers share details of brand new 3G pitch
 Watch: Ballymacash Rangers aiming high after opening new 3g pitch
 Sports clubs set to benefit from £70,000 funding boost

Association football venues in Northern Ireland
Sports venues in County Antrim